Claude Soulé (born 14 November 1911, date of death unknown) was a French field hockey player who competed in the 1936 Summer Olympics.

He was a member of the French field hockey team, which finish fourth in the 1936 Olympic tournament. He played all five matches as forward.

External links
 
Claude Soulé's profile at Sports Reference.com

1911 births
Year of death missing
French male field hockey players
Olympic field hockey players of France
Field hockey players at the 1936 Summer Olympics